Mitchell Owen (Mitch) Shirra (born 27 September 1958 in Auckland, New Zealand) is a former motorcycle speedway rider who rode with the Coventry Bees, Reading Racers, Swindon Robins and Ipswich Witches in the British League.

Career
Shirra began riding at the Kembla Grange Speedway in New South Wales in 1973 at the age of 14 (he lied about his age in order to race as riders had to be at least 16 years old), although he would consider the Liverpool Speedway in Sydney as his home track. Early in his career this actually led him to ride as an Australian rider, though by the late 1970s when his true age and nationality was revealed he would be considered a New Zealand rider.

In 1975, Shirra joined the Coventry Bees and was loaned out to the Coatbridge Tigers for a year. From 1976-1982 he rode for Coventry then transferred to the Reading Racers. In 1987 he was loaned out to the Swindon Robins but returned to Reading in 1988–1989. In 1990 he was banned from the British League for a season for bringing the sport into disrepute after failing two drug tests. Controversy about the decision soon followed and the ban was lifted by the speedway control board. After three months, Shirra returned to racing for the remainder of the 1990 season. He returned to race for Reading in 1991, Swindon in 1992, the Ipswich Witches in 1993 and 1994 he was awarded best club rider that season.

In February 1978, Shirra won his first championship meeting when he took out the Australasian Championship at the Western Springs Speedway in Auckland.

He won the British League Pairs Championship in 1978 with Ole Olsen. That same year Coventry Bees won the British league title with Shirra riding at number 3.

In 1979 he was a member of the New Zealand team with Larry Ross, Bruce Cribb, Roger Abel and Ivan Mauger which won the World Team Cup at the White City Stadium in London. This would prove to be the only World Championship win of Shirra's career and the only time he rode in a World Team Cup Final.

He won the Brandonapolis at Coventry in 1980, and won the Dutch Golden Helmet at Veenoord in 1982. He was also on the rostrum at the Golden Helmet of Pardubice where he finished in 3rd place.

Shirra competed in his first individual World Final in 1983 at the Motodrom Halbemond in Norden, West Germany where he finished in 11th place having scored 7 points. He was again a World Finalist in 1984 at the Ullevi Stadium in Göteborg, Sweden where he scored 10 points for a career best 5th place. He would go on to ride in another five World Finals during his career (1986, 1987, 1989, 1991 and 1992). He was 6th at the Munich Olympic Stadium in 1989.

In 1984, Shirra finished 3rd in the World Pairs Championship with Ivan Mauger at the Pista Speedway in Lonigo, Italy. Devastation soon followed his success towards the end of 1984. During an open meeting at Western Springs in Auckland, Shirra sustained a shattered pelvis and femur along with internal injuries. It was feared he would not return to racing but after a lengthy recovery he did return, and continued to have much success and countless podium finishes at a British/European and international level. One of his biggest wins would come when he won the Overseas Final at the Odsal Stadium in Bradford in 1987.

In 1990, Shirra was named as the team manager for the World All-Stars team who took on England in a 3 match Sidecar speedway series ran in England. The World team consisted mostly of those from his native New Zealand as well as Australia.

In 1992 he finished 2nd in the Long Track World Championship, finishing only one point behind Switzerland's Marcel Gerhard. During 1991/92 Mitch to date is the only rider to win all three race meetings at the Australasian Long track series (Albion Park Paceway in Brisbane, the Bathurst Showgrounds and the Addington Raceway in Christchurch).

Shirra is also a three time New Zealand Champion, having won the title in 1982 (Western Springs), 1983 (Ruapuna Speedway), and 1984 (Penlee Speedway). He finished runner-up in the NZ Championship in 1979, 1981 and 1987, while finishing third in 1986.

With the help of American friend John Cook, Shirra rode to victory in the 1988 European Jet Ski championship winning in two classes. The same year he competed in a televised competition called Run The Gauntlet hosted by Martin Shaw, His team finished second.

Shirra won the Morgan Mile title held in South Australia on a hybrid fuel injected Long track bike in 1996, also taking out the speedway class making it a double at the same event. 

After receiving a wild card for the 2003 World Long track Championship held at New Plymouth, Shirra had success with a win in the final.

Shirra won the Decade of dirt long track title held at Muswellbrook in NSW in 2006 riding a bike prepared by Mike Farrell Transport.

Shirra rode at an International/professional level for 33 years.

Shirra now resides in country New South Wales, Australia. He has one son Jenz Mitchell Shirra (Born in England on 11 August 1981).

World final appearances

Individual World Championship
 1983 -  Norden, Motodrom Halbemond  - 11th - 7pts
 1984 -  Göteborg, Ullevi - 5th - 10pts
 1986 -  Chorzów, Silesian Stadium - 16th - 1pt
 1987 -  Amsterdam, Olympic Stadium - 9th - 12pts
 1989 -  Munich, Olympic Stadium  - 6th - 10pts
 1991 -  Göteborg, Ullevi - 13th - 4pts
 1992 -  Wrocław, Olympic Stadium - 13th - 6pts

World Pairs Championship
 1982 -  Sydney, Liverpool City Raceway (with Larry Ross*) - 6th - 13pt (8)
 1984 -  Lonigo, Pista Speedway (with Ivan Mauger) - 3rd - 25pt (16)
 1985 -  Rybnik, Rybnik Municipal Stadium (with Ivan Mauger) - 4th - 15pt (7)
 1986 -  Pocking, Rottalstadion (with Larry Ross) - 5th - 32pt (12)
 1987 -  Pardubice, Svítkov Stadion (with David Bargh) - 4th - 36pt (16)
 1988 -  Bradford, Odsal Stadium (with Alan Rivett**) - 4th - 32pt (24)
 1992 -  Lonigo, Pista Speedway (with David Bargh, Mark Thorpe) - 6th - 14pt (12)
* Australian rider and meeting reserve Phil Herne rode one race as Larry Ross had bike trouble** Australian rider Alan Rivett replaced the injured David Bargh

World Team Cup
 1979 -  London, White City Stadium (with Ivan Mauger / Larry Ross / Bruce Cribb / Roger Abel) - Winner - 35pts (10)

Long track World Championship
1991 -  Mariánské Lázně - 5th
1992 -  Pfarrkirchen - 2nd
1993 -  Mühldorf - 8th

References

1958 births
Living people
New Zealand speedway riders
Reading Racers riders
Coventry Bees riders
Swindon Robins riders